This is a list of scientists from Cornwall, a county of England, in the United Kingdom.

Biologists
Henry Charlton Bastian, physiologist and neurologist
Lieutenant-Colonel Frederick Nicholson Betts, Indian Army officer and ornithologist
 George Carter Bignell, entomologist
 William Borlase, naturalist, geologist and antiquary, Rector of Ludgvan
 William Clift, naturalist and Fellow of the Royal Society 
 Jonathan Couch, naturalist and physician
 Richard Quiller Couch, naturalist
Frederick Hamilton Davey, botanist
Jean Golding, epidemiologist
Henry Brougham Guppy, naturalist and botanist
Charles Alexander Johns, botanist and clergyman
Oscar Kempthorne, statistician and geneticist
William Lobb, plant collector
 John Keast Lord, veterinarian and naturalist 
 Richard Lower, blood transfusion pioneer
 John Mayow, physiologist
 William Noye of Paul, entomologist
Francis Polkinghorne Pascoe, entomologist
 John Ralfs, botanist
 Edward Hearle Rodd, ornithologist
 John Coulson Tregarthen, naturalist
 Ethelwynn Trewavas, ichthyologist
 Sir Richard Vyvyan, Bart, MP for Cornwall and scientist
William Wagstaff, ornithologist and naturalist
Elizabeth Andrew Warren, botanist

Earth scientists
 William Borlase, naturalist, geologist and antiquary, Rector of Ludgvan
 Edward Budge, geologist and clergyman
 Elizabeth Carne, geologist and philanthropist
 Joseph Carne, geologist, industrialist and Fellow of the Royal Society
 Richard Edmonds, geologist and antiquary
 Robert Were Fox, FRS, geologist
 William Gregor, discoverer of titanium and clergyman
 John Hawkins, geologist, traveller and FRS
Robert Hunt, mineralogist and writer
 Matthew Paul Moyle, meteorologist and mining writer
 Ben Peach, geologist
 William Pengelly, geologist and archaeologist
 John Arthur Phillips, FRS, geologist, metallurgist, mining engineer

Physical scientists 
 John Couch Adams, co-discoverer of the planet Neptune
 Herbert Stanley Allen, physicist
Edmund Davy, chemist 
Sir Humphry Davy, 1st Baronet, chemist and inventor
 Edwin Dunkin, FRS, President of the Royal Astronomical Society and the Royal Institution of Cornwall
 Antony Hewish, astronomer
Sir William Lower (1570 – 1615), astronomer and Member of Parliament 
Nathan Mayne, astrophysicist
 William Oliver, FRS, inventor of the Bath Oliver and a founder of the Royal Mineral Water Hospital at Bath
Roy Sambles, physicist

Others
 Lancelot Stephen Bosanquet, mathematician 
 Davies Gilbert, applied mathematician and technocrat, President of the Royal Society
 Daniel Gumb (died 1776), mathematician and stonemason who lived in a cave near the Cheesewring at Linkinhorne
 John Hellins, FRS, mathematician, curate of Constantine

See also

List of Cornish engineers and inventors

References

Scientists and Inventors
Cornish
Cornish